A service structure is a steel framework or tower that is built on a rocket launch pad to facilitate assembly and servicing. 

An umbilical tower also usually includes an elevator which allows maintenance and crew access. Immediately before ignition of the rocket's motors, all connections between the tower and the craft are severed, and the bridges over which these connections pass often quickly swing away to prevent damage to the structure or vehicle.

Kennedy Space Center
During the Space Shuttle program, the structures at the Launch Complex 39 pads contained a two-piece access tower system, the Fixed Service Structure (FSS) and the Rotating Service Structure (RSS). The FSS permitted access to the Shuttle via a retractable arm and a "beanie cap" to capture vented LOX from the external tank.

The FSS on Pad 39A was constructed from most of the top of the umbilical tower of Mobile Launcher 2, while the FSS that was on 39B was constructed from most of the top of the umbilical tower of Mobile Launcher 3 (Mobile Launcher 3 would later become Mobile Launcher Platform 1 for the Shuttle).

In 2011 NASA removed both the fixed and rotating service structures from their pad at LC-39B to make way for a new generation of launch vehicles. Likewise in 2017-2018 SpaceX removed the rotating service structure from LC-39A and modified the fixed service structure to adapt it for the new series of launch vehicles to be launched there.

Certain rockets such as the Delta and the Saturn V use structures consisting of a fixed portion, formally called the umbilical tower and a mobile portion, which is moved away from the vehicle several hours before launch called mobile service tower/structure.  The mobile portion is often called a gantry.

White room 

The white room was the small area used by NASA astronauts to access the spacecraft during human flights up through the Space Shuttle program.  The room takes its name from the white paint, which was used on the Gemini.  The room was first used in Project Mercury, its use and white color (since Gemini) continued through subsequent programs of Apollo and the Space Shuttle.  

NASA used this room for astronaut final preparations before entering the spacecraft such as donning parachute packs, putting on helmets and detaching portable air conditioning units.
After 2014, NASA planned to move the White Room to a museum. As of the Crew Dragon Demo-2 mission, SpaceX uses the term White Room to refer to the end of the Crew Access Arm at LC-39A. On the first launch attempt, NASA and SpaceX began a tradition to sign the NASA meatball logo (for NASA launches) or the SpaceX X logo (for private launches) at the end of the Crew Access Arm.

Baikonur Cosmodrome
Similarly, Soviet-and Russian-designed service structures such as those at the Baikonur Cosmodrome stand while servicing the vehicle. The entire structure pivots outward and downward out of the way.

References

Rocket launch technologies
Apollo program hardware
Space Shuttle program